The Suzuki X-90 is a front engine, rear or four wheel drive, two door, two seater SUV manufactured and marketed by Suzuki for the model years of 1995 to 1997. Related to the Suzuki Vitara, the X-90 featured a T Section removable roof. Replacing the Samurai in the market in the United States, Suzuki began marketing the X-90 in Japan by the end of 1995, and in western markets in April 1996.

The X-90 used a 1.6 L I4 16 valve engine which produced  and was available with four wheel drive or rear wheel drive, and either a five speed manual or automatic transmission. The X-90 featured dual air bags, anti lock brakes, optional air conditioning, and one dealer installed six disc CD changer.

The suspension used MacPherson struts and coil springs in front and coil springs with wishbone and trailing links in the rear. A space saver spare wheel is stored in the trunk, and space behind the two seats offers further cargo area. The X-90 debuted as a concept car at the 1993 Tokyo Motor Show.

Suzuki presented the production vehicle in 1995, and began marketing the X-90 by the end of that year in Japan, with international markets the following year. 1,348 were sold in Japan, and 7,205 X-90s were imported into the United States. More than half in the United States were sold in 1996, with sales of 2,087 the next year, and 477 in 1998.

During 1996, 484 vehicles were imported into Australia. The X-90 was also imported into Europe. By the middle of 1997, the retail pricing had dropped by 25%. No further imports occurred, and the last of the vehicles sold in 1999. The X-90 was the base vehicle for Red Bull's advertising vehicles, which featured a 1.5 m (5') mockup of the company's product can mounted over the trunk.

In October 2013, Top Gear Magazine placed the X-90 on its list of The 13 Worst Cars of the Last 20 Years. In March 2022, Motor Trend named the X-90 #1 on its list of the 25 worst cars of the 1990s.

Philippe Cousteau Special Edition

Towards the end of the X-90's production run some X-90s in Europe were sold as the Suzuki Vitara X-90 Philippe Cousteau Special Edition. These featured a moulded bodykit that included a bullbar, running boards, wheel arch extensions all finished in the body colour as well as special 16 inch wheels and decals that numbered the vehicle out of 3000. The special edition was named after the French cinematographer Philippe Cousteau, despite his death occurring more than 15 years before the first X-90 was produced.

References

External links
 Dutch, English, German and French X-90 site

X-90
Rear-wheel-drive vehicles
All-wheel-drive vehicles
Cars introduced in 1995
Mini sport utility vehicles